Christian Berentz or Bernetz (1658–1722) was a German Baroque painter.

Biography
Berentz was born in Hamburg, Germany. According to the RKD pupil he was the pupil of Hermann Kamphusen from 1667 to 1673 and then from 1673 to 1677 a pupil of Georg Hainz. He travelled through the Netherlands in the years 1677-1679 and in 1679 he travelled to Venice and from there to Rome where he stayed until 1722. Like Franz Werner von Tamm (called Dapper), he is registered as the teacher of Pietro Navarra. Like Tamm, Berentz is also registered as working in the Carlo Maratta studio. He is known for still lifes in the manner of Pieter Claesz, Maximilian Pfeiler, Willem Kalf, Pieter Gerritsz van Roestraten, and Francesco Noletti.

In Rome in the 1700s, he lived in the house of Marchese Pallavicini. Berentz painted primarily still lifes, and was important, because he introduced North European themes. He died in Rome in 1722.

References

Christian Berentz on Artnet
Simona Sperindei, Niccolò Maria Pallavicini, mecenate, collezionista e protettore di Christian Berentz, in "Annali della Pontificia Insigne Accademia di Belle Arti e Lettere dei Virtuosi al Pantheon", XII, 2012, pp. 537–542.

1658 births
1722 deaths
17th-century German painters
German male painters
18th-century German painters
18th-century German male artists
German Baroque painters
Artists from Hamburg
Flower artists
Pupils of Carlo Maratta